Harold Charles Schonberg (29 November 1915 – 26 July 2003) was an American music critic and author. He is best known for his contributions in The New York Times, where he was chief music critic from 1960 to 1980. In 1971, he became the first music critic to win the Pulitzer Prize for Criticism. An influential critic, he is particularly well known for his encouragement of Romantic piano music and criticism of conductor Leonard Bernstein. He also wrote a number of books on music, and one on chess.

Life and career

Early life
Harold Charles Schonberg was born in Washington Heights, Manhattan in New York City, New York on 29 November 1915. His parents were David and Minnie (Kirsch) Schonberg, and he had a brother (Stanley) and a sister (Edith). His aunt, Alice Frisca was an early influence and his first music teacher; she was a former concert pianist, and had studied with Leopold Godowsky. He started piano lessons with Frisca at four years old, and "discovered early on that he had a superb musical memory that allowed him to remember pieces in great detail after a single hearing". Schonberg himself cited the first performance he saw at the Metropolitan Opera around age 12 as particularly formative to his musical upbringing. A performance of Richard Wagner's Die Meistersinger von Nürnberg with the conductor Artur Bodanzky, he would later write on the experience 39 years later, reflecting on the opera's opening chord that it "rose to the dress circle, and he felt as though he could reach out, touch it, caress it. He had been to concerts before, but somehow, in this vast dark auditorium, there was a different feeling to the texture and even the organization of this chord. It sounded warm and cozy. It covered him like a blanket." In his recounting of the event, Schonberg claimed the experience as having inaugurated his desire to be a music critic. 

Schonberg received a Bachelor of Arts at Brooklyn College (1937), during which he published his first music criticism in the Musical Advance journal. He then studied as a graduate student at New York University, receiving a Master of Arts in 1938 while studying under the composer Marion Bauer. His dissertation concerned Elizabethan songbooks, which he studied in both musical and literary contexts. In his early life, Schonberg was also interested in the visual arts, studying drawing at the Art Students League of New York and sometimes illustrating his music criticism with caricatures of the musicians they featured. In 1939, Schonberg received his first post as a music critic: he was associate editor and critic at the American Music Lover.

During World War II, Schonberg was a first lieutenant in the United States Army Airborne Signal Corps. He had hoped to enlist as a pilot, but was declared pastel-blind (he could distinguish colors but not shadings and subtleties) and was sent to London, where he was a code breaker and later a parachutist. He broke his leg on a training jump before D-Day and could not participate in the Normandy landings; every member of his platoon who jumped into France was ultimately killed. He remained in the Army until 1946.

At The New York Times
Schonberg joined The New York Times in 1950. He rose to the post of senior music critic for the Times a decade later. In this capacity he published daily reviews and longer features on operas and classical music on Sundays. He also worked effectively behind the scenes to increase music coverage in the Times and develop its first-rate music staff. Upon his retirement as senior music critic in 1980, he became cultural correspondent for the Times.

Schonberg also wrote articles for Harper's and High Fidelity magazine, among others.

Schonberg was an extremely influential music writer. Aside from his contributions to music journalism, he published 13 books, most of them on music, including The Great Pianists: From Mozart to the Present (1963, revised 1987)—pianists were a specialty of Schonberg—and The Lives of the Great Composers (1970; revised 1981, 1997) which traced the lives of major composers from Monteverdi through to modern times. Schonberg wrote a biography of Vladimir Horowitz, one of the most famous pianists of the 20th century, entitled Horowitz: His Life and Music (1992).

Criticisms of Bernstein
Schonberg was highly critical of Leonard Bernstein during the composer-conductor's eleven-year tenure (1958–69) as principal conductor of the New York Philharmonic. He accused Bernstein of showing off by using exaggerated gestures on the podium and of conducting a piece in a way that made its structure overly obvious to audiences (e.g., slowing down during the transition from one main theme to another).

One of Schonberg's best remembered criticisms of Bernstein was written after the famous 6 April 1962, performance before which Bernstein announced that he disagreed with pianist Glenn Gould's interpretation of Brahms' Piano Concerto No. 1 but was going to conduct it anyway because he found it fascinating. Schonberg chided Bernstein in print, suggesting that he should have either refrained from publicizing his disagreement, backed out of the concert, or imposed his own will on Gould; Schonberg called Bernstein "the Peter Pan of music". In the chapter on Bernstein in his 1967 book The Great Conductors, Schonberg quotes the remark but neglects to mention that he was the critic who had made it.

After Bernstein's regular tenure at the New York Philharmonic ended, however, Schonberg seemed to mellow in his attitude toward him and actually began to praise his conducting, stating in his book The Glorious Ones that "with age, came less of a need to prove something", and that "there were moments of glory in his conceptions."

Later life and death

In 1984, Schonberg taught music criticism at McMaster University in Hamilton, Canada.

In 1987, it was announced that Schonberg was assisting Vladimir Horowitz in the preparation of the pianist's memoirs. Although the project was never completed, Schonberg's biography of Horowitz was published in 1992. Also in 1987, he served on the jury of the Paloma O'Shea Santander International Piano Competition.

Schonberg died in New York City on 26 July 2003, at the age of 87, of an unspecified cause. In his obituary notice in The New York Times the next day, Allan Kozinn wrote that Schonberg "set the standard for critical evaluation and journalistic thoroughness." The University of Maryland Libraries have a Harold C. Schonberg collection in their International Piano Archives at Maryland; it contains a substantial collection of correspondences between Schonberg and fellow critics, musicians and readers.

Other interests
A devoted and skilled chess player, Schonberg covered the 1972 championship match between Boris Spassky and Bobby Fischer held in Reykjavík, Iceland. One of Schonberg's books not on music was Grandmasters of Chess. He also reviewed mysteries and thrillers for The New York Times under the pseudonym Newgate Callender from 1972 to 1995.

Schonberg was an avid golfer, though a poor one by his own estimation. He co-authored the book How To Play Double Bogey Golf (1975) along with Hollis Alpert, founder of the National Society of Film Critics, and fellow author Ira Mothner. Schonberg, Mothner and Alpert frequently played golf together, according to the book.

Selected publications

Books
Source:
 
 
 
 
 
 
 
 
 
  (a biography of Vladimir Horowitz)

References

Notes

Citations

Sources

Further reading
 
 
 
 
 
  
 

American music critics
Opera critics
Classical music critics
Pulitzer Prize for Criticism winners
Culture of New York City
Critics employed by The New York Times
American chess writers
American male non-fiction writers
1915 births
2003 deaths
Writers from New York City
United States Army personnel of World War II
Brooklyn College alumni
New York University alumni
Academic staff of McMaster University
United States Army officers
20th-century American male writers